Someone Else's Happiness is a 2005 Belgian-Dutch film directed and written by Fien Troch. The movie was the Belgian entry for the Academy Awards 2006 in the category Best Foreign Language Film but failed to receive the actual nomination.

Cast 
 Ina Geerts	 as Christine
 Johanna ter Steege as Ann
 Johan Leysen as Francis
 Natali Broods as Gerda
 Peter Van den Begin as Mark
 Josse De Pauw as Inspecteur

Awards and nominations 
 Joseph Plateau Awards:
 Best Belgian Director (Fien Troch, nominated) 
 Best Belgian Film (nominated)
 Best Belgian Screenplay (Fien Troch, nominated)
 Thessaloniki Film Festival:
 Best Actress	 (Ina Geerts, won)
 Best Screenplay (Fien Troch, won)
 Golden Alexander (Fien Troch, won) 
 Special Mention (Natali Broods for the acting)

See also 
 List of Belgian submissions for Academy Award for Best Foreign Language Film

2005 films
Belgian drama films
2000s Dutch-language films
Films directed by Fien Troch
Dutch drama films